Novyye Omelniki is a rural locality (a village) in Satyyevsky Selsoviet, Miyakinsky District, Bashkortostan, Russia. The population was 64 as of 2010. There are 2 streets.

Geography 
Novyye Omelniki is located 14 km southwest of Kirgiz-Miyaki (the district's administrative centre) by road. Shatra is the nearest rural locality.

References 

Rural localities in Miyakinsky District